Daniel George Stec (born February 21, 1969) is an American politician serving as a member of the New York State Senate for the 45th district. He represents all of Clinton, Essex, Franklin, and Warren Counties, and parts of St. Lawrence County and Washington County. He previously represented the 114th district of the New York State Assembly.

Early life and career
Stec was born to George, a Vietnam War veteran and New York State Forest Ranger, and Elsie, a school secretary. He was raised in Queensbury, New York and graduated from Queensbury High School in 1987. He earned a Bachelor of Science degree in chemical engineering from Clarkson University in Potsdam, New York.

Career 

In 2011, Stec became the chairman of the Warren County Board of Supervisors. He was elected to the New York State Assembly in 2012, serving until 2020. He was elected to the New York State Senate in 2020, defeating Clinton County Treasurer Kimberly Davis.

References

External links
New York Assembly member website
Campaign website

1969 births
Clarkson University alumni
Living people
Republican Party members of the New York State Assembly
People from Queensbury, New York
University of Rhode Island alumni
21st-century American politicians